This is a list of fictional hackers.

Comics and sequential art

Batman-related comics
 Lonnie Machin (Moneyspider): an anarchist vigilante, featured in Anarky and various Batman-related comics, published by DC Comics
 Tim Drake (Robin): the third Robin of the Batman Family, published by DC Comics
 Barbara Gordon (Oracle): a major character in various Batman-related comics and Birds of Prey
 Noah Kuttler (The Calculator): brilliant hacker villain in DC Comics
 Wendy Harris (Proxy)

The Hacker Files
 Jack Marshall (Hacker) – protagonist of The Hacker Files series
 Barbara Gordon (Oracle)
 Master Blaster
 Cowboy
 Sue Denim
 Phreaky Phreddy
 Spider

Ghost Rider 2099
 Artificial Kidz:
 Kenshiro "Zero" Cochrane (Ghost Rider)
 Warewolf
 Phrack
 2600
 Jimmy Alhazared (Doctor Neon)

Sam sepiol

Mr robot

Literature

Anonymous by Jhala Vs Jhali 
 Jhala (Strength)
 Jhali (Weekness)
 Anonymous

The Blue Nowhere (Jeffery Deaver novel)
 Wyatt Gillette (Valleyman)
 Phate (Jon Patrick Holloway)

The Chronicles of Amber by Roger Zelazny
Merlin of Amber aka Merle Corey, the protagonist of the second series
Rinaldo aka Lucas "Luke" Reynard, his best friend

Cryptonomicon
 Randy Waterhouse

Discworld
 The Smoking GNU (Mad Al, Sane Alex and Undecided Adrian) – (clacks hackers)
 Ponder Stibbons (clacks hacker, through Hex)

Drawing Blood
 Zach Bosch

Genius series (Catherine Jinks novels)
 Cadel English

The Girl with the Dragon Tattoo/Millennium series
 Lisbeth Salander (Wasp) – protagonist
 Other hackers appearing occasionally, known by nickname only:
 Plague (Swedish)
 Trinity (British)
 Bob the Dog (British)
 Bilbo (American in Texas)

Hex
 Raven – Hex, Hex: Shadows, Hex: Ghosts

Holo.Wars: The Black Hats
 Steve Cylander
 F8th
 Hauk
 Dark0

Jurassic Park
 Lex Murphy
 Dennis Nedry

Kidd series (John Sandford novels)
 Kidd
 Bobby

Little Brother (Cory Doctorow novel)
 W1n5t0n
M1K3Y

Neuromancer
 Henry Dorsett Case

Oryx and Crake
Crake

The Shockwave Rider
 Nick Haflinger

Snow Crash
 Da5id Meier
 Hiro Protagonist
 In the context of the plot, Enki is considered to be "the original hacker", capable of modifying the behavior of society
 Jaunita gains some of the skills attributed to Enki

Splinter Cell series
 Anna Grimsdóttír (Grim)
 Marcus Greenhorn

Tori Swyft thriller series (John M Green novels)
 FIGJAM Thatcher in The Trusted and The Tao Deception
 Red Scorpion in The Tao Deception

Film

Ace Ventura
 Woodstock

Antitrust
 Milo Hoffman

Assassins
 Elektra

Bait
 Bristol

Blackhat
 Nicholas Hathaway
 Sadak

The Core
 Taz Finch ("Ratt")

Cowboy Bebop: The Movie
 Lee Sampson

Cube 2: Hypercube
 Alex Trusk

Die Hard
 Theo

Enemy of the State
 Edward Lyle (Brill)

Furious 7
 Ramsey

Ghost in the Machine
 Karl Hochman

Ghost in the Shell: Stand Alone Complex
 The Laughing Man

GoldenEye
 Boris Grishenko

Gone in 60 Seconds
 Toby

Hackers
 Kate Libby ("Acid Burn")
 Ramόn Sánchez ("Phantom Phreak")
 Paul Cook ("Lord Nikon")
 Eugene Belford ("The Plague")
 Dade Murphy ("Zero Cool" a.k.a. "Crash Override")
 Joey Pardella
 Emmanuel Goldstein ("Cereal Killer")

Independence Day
 David Levinson (Alien OS hacker)

The Italian Job 2003
 Lyle ("The Real Napster")

Johnny Mnemonic
 Jones (The Dolphin)
 Strike

The Lawnmower Man
 Jobe Smith

Live Free or Die Hard
 Matthew Farrell
 Thomas Gabriel
 Freddie ("Warlock")

The Losers
 Jake Jensen

The Matrix
 Apoc
 Cypher (Mr. Reagan)
 Dozer
 Ghost
 Morpheus
 Mouse
 Neo (Thomas A. Anderson)
 Switch
 Tank
 Trinity

Mission Impossible
 Luther Stickell

National Treasure
 Riley Poole

The Net
 Angela Bennett ("Angel")
 Jack Devlin

Ocean's 13

Office Space
 Michael Bolton
 Samir Nagheenanajad
 Peter Gibbons

Serenity
 Mr. Universe

Sneakers
 Martin Bishop
 Erwin Emery (Whistler)
 Darryl Roskow (Mother)

Superman III
 Gus Gorman

Swordfish
 Stanley Jobson
 Axel Torvalds

Terminator 2: Judgment Day
 John Connor

Trackers (Patrick Carman novel)
 Shantorian

Tron
 Kevin Flynn

WarGames
 David Lightman

Wreck-It Ralph 

 King Candy (Turbo)

XXX: State of the Union
 Agent Toby Lee Shavers

Ocean's 8
 Nine Ball

Television

24
 Chloe O'Brian

Agents of S.H.I.E.L.D.
 Daisy "Skye" Johnson

Alias
 Marshall Flinkman
 Rachel Gibson

Arrow
 Felicity Smoak

Batman Beyond
 Maxine Gibson

Battle Programmer Shirase
 Akira Shirase

Birds of Prey
 Barbara Gordon/Oracle

Blake's 7
 Kerr Avon

Bloody Monday
 Takagi Fujimaru (Falcon)

Bones
 Christopher Pelant
 Angela Montenegro

Breaking In
 Bret Harrison

Buffy the Vampire Slayer
 Willow Rosenberg

Chuck
 Chuck Bartowski
 Stephen J. Bartowski

Code Lyoko
 Jeremie Belpois
 Aelita Schaeffer

Continuum
 Alec Sadler

Covert Affairs
 Auggie Anderson

Cowboy Bebop 
 Ed (Radical Edward) – short for Edward Wong Hau Pepelu Tivrusky IV

Criminal Minds
 Penelope Garcia
Hacker handle: The Black Queen

CSI: Cyber
 Brody Nelson
 Raven Ramirez
 Daniel Krumitz ("Krummy")

Dark Angel
 Logan Cale (Eyes Only)

Doctor Who
 The Doctor 
 Adam Mitchell
 Clara Oswald / Oswin Oswald
 Mickey Smith
 Bob Salmon – Doctor Who Past Doctor Adventures  novel Blue Box by Kate Orman
 Sarah Swan ("Fionnula") – Doctor Who Past Doctor Adventures  novel Blue Box by Kate Orman

Earth: Final Conflict
 Marcus "Augur" Deveraux

Eden of the East
 Yutaka ("Pantsu") Itazu
 Juiz

Eureka (American TV series)
 Zane Donovan

The Flash (2014)
 Cisco Ramon

General Hospital
 Stan Johnson
 Damian Spinelli

Ghost in the Shell: Stand Alone Complex
 Aoi (Laughing Man)

Inspector Gadget
 Penny Brown

Johnny Chase (T-Mobile commercials)
 Johnny Chase

Kim Possible
 Wade

Level 9
 Roland Travis
 Margaret "Sosh" Perkins
 Jargon

Leverage
 Alec Hardison
 Colin Mason ('Chaos')

Lone Wolf McQuade
 Kayo Ramos

MacGyver
 Kate – (Episode: "Ugly Duckling")

Max Headroom
 Theora Jones
 Bryce Lynch

Mr. Robot
 Elliot Alderson: Sam Sepiol
 Darlene Alderson: Dolores Haze
 Shama Biswas: Trenton
 Sunil Markesh: Mobley
 Leslie Romero
 Cisco

NCIS
 Abby Sciuto
 Timothy McGee

Nikita
 Seymour Birkoff

Person of Interest
 Harold Finch
 Samantha Groves (Root)

The Raccoons
 Bentley Raccoon

ReBoot
 Mouse

Scandal 
Charlie
Huck
Jake Ballard
Quinn Perkins

seaQuest DSV
 Lucas Wolenczak ("Frankenstein")
 Mark ("Wolfman")
 Martin Clemens ("Mycroft")

Serial Experiments Lain
Lain Iwakura

Smallville
 Chloe Sullivan

Spider-Man: The Animated Series
 Hobgoblin

Team Knight Rider
 Kevin ("Trek") Sanders

Torchwood
 Esther Drummond
 Ianto Jones
 Jack Harkness
 Toshiko Sato

Undergrads
 Justin Taylor ("Gimpy")

Veronica Mars
Cindy "Mac" Mackenzie

Warehouse 13
 Claudia Donovan

Witch Hunter Robin
 Michael Lee

The X-Files
 Invisigoth ("Ester Nairn")
 The Lone Gunmen (also featured in The Lone Gunmen)
John Fitzgerald Byers
Melvin Frohike
Richard Langly

Z Nation
 Citizen Z
 Kaya in da Skya

Video games

Apex Legends
 Crypto

Assassin's Creed: Unity
 Bishop

Command & Conquer: Generals
 Black Lotus

Danganronpa: Trigger Happy Havoc
Chihiro Fujisaki

Deus Ex: Human Revolution
 Frank Pritchard

The Longest Journey
 Burns Flipper

Mega Man X
 Middy

Metal Gear Solid
 Dr. Hal Emmerich ("Otacon")

Metal Slug
 Marco Rossi

Mystic Messenger 
 707
 Vanderwood
 Unknown/Saeran/Ray

Hacker Evolution
 Brian Spencer

Hacknet
 Bitwise (Bit)
 Kaguya (From the DLC Labyrinths)
 Coel (From the DLC Labyrinths)
 D3F4ULT (From the DLC Labyrinths)
 CSEC (Hacking Group inside game.)
 The Kaguya Trials (DLC Hacker Group in the game)
 Striker (Rival on the DLC Labyrinths)
 Naix (Main Game Rival)

Honkai Impact 3rd and Honkai: Star Rail
 Bronya Zaychik

Overwatch
 Sombra

Persona 5
 Futaba Sakura

Saints Row: The Third
 Kinzie Kensington

Sly Cooper
Bentley

System Shock
 The Hacker
 Dexter Witer

Team Fortress 2
 Spy

Vampire: The Masquerade
 Mitnick – Vampire: The Masquerade - Bloodlines, based on real-life hacker Kevin Mitnick
 Dev/Null – Vampire: The Masquerade - Redemption

Watch Dogs and Watch Dogs 2
 Aiden Pearce (The Vigilante/The Fox)
 JB Marcowicz (Defalt)
 Raymond Kenney (T-Bone)
 Damien Brenks
 Clara Lille (BadBoy17)
 Johnacious Mailkmon
 Delford Wade (Iraq)
 Marcus Holloway (Retr0)
 Josh Sauchak (Hawt Sauce)
 Reginald (Wr3nch)
 Horatio Carlin
 DedSec – hacker group within the game

Many more can be added.

Role-playing games

Cyberpunk 2020
 Altiera 'Alt' Cunningham
 Rache Bartmoss
 Spider Murphy

Shadowrun
Fastjack
Netcat

Multi-media franchises

A Certain Magical Index
Kazari Uiharu, aka The Goalkeeper

Cult of the Dead Cow
Demonseed Elite – CULT OF THE DEAD COW's ezine (and many others) / Mage: The Ascension

Ghost in the Shell
Project 2501, aka The Puppet Master

Hackers